Ypthima praestans is a butterfly in the family Nymphalidae. It is found in Angola, the Democratic Republic of the Congo and Zambia.

References

praestans
Butterflies described in 1954